The 1989–90 Australian region cyclone season was an above average tropical cyclone season. It was also an event in the ongoing cycle of tropical cyclone formation. It ran from 1 November 1989 to 30 April 1990. The regional tropical cyclone operational plan also defines a tropical cyclone year separately from a tropical cyclone season, and the "tropical cyclone year" ran from 1 July 1989 to 30 June 1990.

Tropical cyclones in this area were monitored by four Tropical Cyclone Warning Centres (TCWCs): the Australian Bureau of Meteorology in Perth, Darwin, and Brisbane; and TCWC Port Moresby in Papua New Guinea.

Seasonal summary

Systems

Tropical Storm 02S 

Tropical Storm 02S existed from July 14 to July 16.

Tropical Cyclone Pedro 

At 0:00 UTC on November 6, the BOM detected an area of low pressure within a monsoonal trough near 7.8°S, 97.2°E., which gradually organized while drifting westward for the next couple of days. On November 8, the disturbance strengthened into a tropical cyclone and was named Pedro. As Pedro moved southward, strong vertical wind shear left the low-level center bare and displaced convection to the northwestern side of the storm. At 0:00 UTC on November 13, Pedro's winds weakened below gale-force and the system degenerated into a remnant system, which dissipated the following day.

At least  of precipitation fell on the island within a 24-hour period, causing localized flooding. A palm plantation and loading wharf were damaged by the storm.

Severe Tropical Cyclone Felicity 

On 13 December, the BoM started to monitor a monsoon low, that had developed within the Arafura Sea to the northeast of Darwin. Over the next day, the system moved southeastwards over the Northern Territory, before it re-curved slightly and entered the Gulf of Carpentaria. Early on 15 December, the system was named Felicity by TCWC Brisbane, after it had become a category 1 tropical cyclone on the Australian Scale. The system subsequently moved into the Coral Sea during 16 December, where it started to rapidly deepen, but did not reattain the classical characteristics of a tropical cyclone. As a result, both TCWC Nadi and TCWC Brisbane treated the system as a tropical depression over the next four days despite winds of between  being observed in the southwest quadrant. Felicity subsequently dissipated during 20 December as it was absorbed by a short-wave trough of low pressure to the north of New Zealand. Some minor damage to vegetation was recorded on the Cape York Peninsula.

Tropical Cyclone Rosita 

Rosita was first noted as a low-pressure system at 18:00 UTC on January 4 while it located well south of Java. Moving swiftly westward, the disturbance gradually organized for two days until slightly weakening due to increasing vertical wind shear. The system remained quasi-stationary until January 9 when a developing ridge in the middle-latitudes forced the disturbance northwestward. The low was ill-defined with a weak and sheared structure on satellite imagery while moving equatorward. By 6:00 UTC the following day, convection began to redevelop and consolidate through January 12 as the disturbance strengthened.

At 15:00 UTC on January 13, tropical storm-force winds formed around the center, prompting the BOM to upgrade the low into Tropical Cyclone Rosita. The nascent cyclone tracked south-southeastward, remaining under the influence of vertical wind shear causing majority of convection to be displaced west of the center. Rosita once again changed course late the next day, shifting northwestward as it lost gale-force winds. The remnants tracked around the periphery of the more intense Severe Tropical Cyclone Sam, before moving equatorward and dissipating on January 17.

Severe Tropical Cyclone Sam 

Sam, 11 to 21 January 1990, near Western Australia

Tropical Cyclone Tina 

Tina, 24 to 29 January 1990, crossed Western Australia

Tropical Cyclone Nancy 

In late January, a monsoon trough spawned a tropical depression on 26 January, over the Coral Sea. The depression developed good outflow, before gaining tropical cyclone characteristic on 31 January, and was designated as Tropical Cyclone Nancy. An upper-level trough forced the storm southward, before shifting southwestward. Between 1–2 February, the cyclone gradually moved just offshore the Brisbane area. Nancy then weakened while continuing to move southward, before transitioning into an extratropical low on 4 February. The remnants eventually dissipated to the west of New Zealand on 8 February.

Nancy caused flash floods responsible for five fatalities.

Severe Tropical Cyclone Vincent 

Vincent, 25 February to 6 March 1990, near Western Australia

Tropical Cyclone Greg 

Greg, 28 February to 5 March 1990, Gulf of Carpentaria

Tropical Cyclone Walter–Gregoara 

Walter, 3 to 27 March 1990, Indian Ocean

Tropical Cyclone Hilda 

Severe Tropical Cyclone Alex 

Alex was a fairly intense system. It existed from 14 to 26 March 1990. Despite the intensity, Alex never caused significant damage.

Severe Tropical Cyclone Ivor 

Ivor, 14 to 26 March 1990, crossed Cape York, Queensland

Tropical Cyclone Bessi 

Bessi, 11 to 18 April 1990, Indian Ocean

Season effects 

|-
| Rosita ||  || bgcolor=#| || bgcolor=#| || bgcolor=#| || None ||  ||  ||
|-
| Tina ||  || bgcolor=#| || bgcolor=#| || bgcolor=#| || Western Australia ||  ||  ||
|-
| Nancy ||  || bgcolor=#| || bgcolor=#| || bgcolor=#| || Queensland, New South Wales, New Zealand ||  ||  ||
|-
| Greg ||  || bgcolor=#| || bgcolor=#| || bgcolor=#| || None ||  ||  ||
|-
| Walter –Gregoara ||  || bgcolor=#| || bgcolor=#| || bgcolor=#| || None ||  ||  ||
|-
| Hilda ||  || bgcolor=#| || bgcolor=#| || bgcolor=#| || New Caledonia ||  ||  ||
|-
| Bessi ||  || bgcolor=#| || bgcolor=#| || bgcolor=#| || None ||  ||  ||
|}

See also 

 List of Southern Hemisphere tropical cyclone seasons
 Atlantic hurricane seasons: 1989, 1990
 Pacific hurricane seasons: 1989, 1990
 Pacific typhoon seasons: 1989, 1990
 North Indian Ocean cyclone seasons: 1989, 1990

Notes

References 

 
Australian region cyclone seasons
Aust